Hausberg (lit.: "house mountain", plural: Hausberge) is German for a prominent mountain or hill in the immediate vicinity of a village, town or city, usually located on its municipal territory, but outside the built up area. It means something like the "local mountain" or "local hill" closely associated with a settlement by its population. The Hausberg forms a backdrop to its home settlement and also offers a prominent viewing point looking over the settlement. As a result, many Hausberge have cable cars or gondola lifts to transport visitors to the top. "Hausberg" is also the proper name of numerous local mountains and hills in German-speaking countries.

The Hausberg does not have to lie within the town's municipal boundaries: The Pfänder, the Hausberg of the town of Bregenz in Austria, is in the municipality of Lochau and the highest summit of the Pilatus, the Hausberg of Lucerne, is just outside the Canton of Lucerne. There is even a national border between Geneva and its Hausberg, the Salève in France.

A hill within a town or city itself is usually referred to in German as a Stadtberg.

Examples 
The following list contains a selection of well-known Hausberge (with heights):

Albania
 Tirana, the Dajti (1,613 m)

Austria 
 Bregenz, the Pfänder (1,064 m)
 Graz, the Schöckl (1,445 m)
 Innsbruck, the Patscherkofel (2,246 m) and the Kleiner Solstein (2,637 m)
 Klagenfurt the Kreuzbergl (517 m)
 Salzburg, the Untersberg (1,973 m) and the Gaisberg (1,288 m)
 Vienna, the Kahlenberg (484 m; 300 m above the city) is the most important Stadtberg in Vienna (east flank of the Vienna Woods); the mountains of the Rax-Schneeberg Group are also viewed as the Vienna Hausberge.

Croatia 
 Zagreb, the Medvednica (Sljeme) (1,035 m)

France 
 Grenoble, the Bastille (476 m)

Germany 
 Aachen: the Lousberg (262.4 m)
 Bad Lauterberg, the Hausberg (ca. 420 m)
 Baden-Baden, the Merkur (668,3 m)
 Coesfeld, the Coesfelder Berg (ca. 140 m)
 Frankfurt am Main, the Lohrberg (212.4 m) and the Großer Feldberg (ca. 879 m)
 Freiburg im Breisgau, the Schlossberg (455.9 m) and the Schauinsland (1,284.4 m)
 Görlitz, the Landeskrone (419.4 m)
 Heidelberg, the Königstuhl (567.8 m) and the Heiligenberg (439.9 m)
 Jena, the Hausberg (391.7 m) and the Jenzig (385.3 m)
 Karlsruhe, the Turmberg (256.0 m)
 Kassel, the Karlsberg (526.2 m) with the Hercules monument (515 m) and the Hohe Gras (614,8 m) with its eponymous viewing tower
 Reutlingen, the Achalm (707.1 m)
 Singen, the Hohentwiel (689.9 m)
 Tübingen, the Österberg (437.9 m)
 Tuttlingen, the Honberg (ca. 739 m) and the Witthoh (862.0 m)
 Weimar, the Großer Ettersberg (481.6 m)
 Wiesbaden, the Neroberg (245.0 m)

Italy 
 Pompeii, Vesuvius (1,281 m)
 Catania, Mount Etna (3,323 m)

Spain 
  Barcelona, the Tibidabo (512 m)

Switzerland 
 Ascona, Monte Verità (321 m)
 Basel, St. Chrischona (522 m; 250 m above the city)
 Bern, the Gurten (858 m; 300 m above the city)
 Chur, the Haldensteiner Calanda (2,806 m)
 Geneva, Mont Salève (1,375 m)
 Grindelwald, the Eiger (3,967 m)
 Locarno, the Cimetta (1,672 m)
 Lugano, Monte Brè (925 m; 650 m above the town) and Monte San Salvatore (912 m)
 Lucerne, the Pilatus (2,132 m)
 Neuchâtel, the Chaumont (1,180 m)
 Solothurn, the Weissenstein (1,395 m)
 St. Gallen, the Säntis (2,502 m)
 Thun, the Stockhorn (2,190 m)
 Zermatt, the Matterhorn (4,478 m)
 Zürich, the Uetliberg (873 m)

Outside Europe

Brazil 
 Rio de Janeiro, Sugarloaf Mountain (395 m) and the Corcovado (710 m)

South Africa 

 Cape Town, Table Mountain (1,087 m)

Japan 
 Sendai, Izumigatake (1,172m)

Kyrgyzstan 
 Osh, Sulayman Mountain (1,110m)

Malaysia 
 Kluang, Mount Lambak (510m)

Oronyms